The 2020 Serbia men's OQT basketball team represented Serbia at the 2020 FIBA Men's Olympic Qualifying Tournament in Belgrade, Serbia in June and July 2021. The team  coached by Igor Kokoškov and led by team captain Miloš Teodosić failed to qualify for the 2020 Summer Olympics.

Background 

Serbia were qualified for the Qualification tournament by taking the 5th place at the 2019 FIBA Basketball World Cup. On 15 November 2019, the Basketball Federation of Serbia has awarded the hosting right of one out of four FIBA Men's Olympic Qualifying Tournaments.

On 13 March 2020, FIBA suspended all FIBA competitions considering the situation with the 2020 coronavirus pandemic. On 30 March, the Summer Olympics has been rescheduled to 2021 due to the same reason. On 9 April, FIBA announced that the Men's Olympic Qualifying Tournaments are rescheduled to 2021.

The Serbia roster entered the Qualification tournament four months after the end of the EuroBasket 2022 qualification where they finished with the first place in Group E with a 4–2 record and got qualified for EuroBasket 2022.

Timeline
 23–28 June 2020: Olympic Qualifying Tournament
 31 May 2021: 25-player preliminary roster announcement
 12 June 2021: The players gathering in Belgrade
 18–23 June 2021: Exhibition games
 27 June 2021: 12-man roster announcement
 29 June–4 July 2021: Olympic Qualifying Tournament

Roster

On 31 May 2021, head coach Igor Kokoškov announced a 25-man preliminary roster for the Olympic Qualifying Tournament. The 25-man roster includes six NBA players: guard Bogdan Bogdanović, forwards Nemanja Bjelica, Aleksej Pokuševski, and Alen Smailagić, as well as centers Nikola Jokić and Boban Marjanović; then two All-EuroLeague Team members for the 2020–21 season: guard Vasilije Micić and forward Vladimir Lučić; as well as six domestic league players. Furthermore, the roster includes three high-profile-leagues regular season MVPs for the 2020–21 season: Jokić (NBA), Micić (EuroLeague), and Miloš Teodosić (EuroCup).

Center Jokić announced his withdrawal on 16 June, stating that his "body condition requires a longer absence from the court to recover". On the same day, head coach Kokoškov announced withdrawals of two more NBA players, Pokuševski and Smailagić. Also, coach Kokoškov said the guards Micić and Teodosić and forwards Lučić and Nikola Kalinić will rest during the Acropolis Tournament. Guard Nemanja Nedović will skip the Olympic Qualifying Tournament due to injury. Furthermore, guards Marko Gudurić, Ognjen Jaramaz, forward Lučić and the 2019 World Cup team captain Miroslav Raduljica were also cut out from the roster due to injuries.

On 27 June, head coach Kokoškov announced the 12-man final roster for the Olympic Qualifying Tournament. In the end, forward Branko Lazić and center Nikola Milutinov was cut from the roster due to health issues while guard Vanja Marinković and the Bosnian-born forward Dalibor Ilić did not make it to the final roster. On 30 June, guard Stefan Jović got a soleus muscle injury in the second game and will miss the rest of the tournament.

The average height of players in the roster is 2.01 metres (6 ft 7 in) which makes the Serbians the tallest roster in the Belgrade Tournament. Standing at 2.22 metres (7 ft 3 in), center Marjanović is the tallest player in the tournament. The average age of the players in the Serbia roster is 29 years old.

The following is the Serbia roster in the Olympic Qualifying Tournament.

Depth chart

Earlier candidates 
The following were candidates to make the team:

Staff 
At the end of the 2019 FIBA Basketball World Cup where Serbia won 5th place, head coach Aleksandar Đorđević announced his decision to leave the position after six years. On 20 November 2019, the Basketball Federation of Serbia named Igor Kokoškov the new head coach of the Serbia team. In December, Dejan Milojević and Vladimir Jovanović were named assistant coaches. On 15 January 2020,  the Federation added the Denver Nuggets head coach Michael Malone to the coaching staff for the Olympic Qualifying Tournament. In May 2021, Kokoškov added conditioning coach Marko Sekulić to his coaching staff. In June 2021, Aleksandar Matović  was added to the staff as a player development coach. As of June 2021, the Nuggets head coach Malone did not join the Serbia staff as it was announced.

Age – describes age on 29 June 2021

Source:

Uniform

Supplier: Peak
Main sponsor: Triglav
Back sponsor: Raiffeisen Bank (below number)
Shorts sponsor: mts

Exhibition games
The Serbia roster played four exhibition games and went undefeated at 4–0. The team played at the 2021 Acropolis of Athens Tournament together with Greece, Puerto Rico and Mexico from 18–20 June 2021. They won the Acropolis Tournament for the second time after went undefeated at 3–0. Afterwards, Serbia won one more game over Mexico in Belgrade on 23 June.

Tournament 
 

The draw was held on 27 November 2019 in Mies, Switzerland. Serbia was drawn into the Belgrade Tournament Group with the Dominican Republic, New Zealand, Puerto Rico, Italy, and Senegal. These matches were originally scheduled to take place between 23 June and 28 June 2020 in Aleksandar Nikolić Hall, Belgrade, but was postponed due to the COVID-19 pandemic, to 29 June to 4 July 2021. Teams are divided into two groups. Serbia was drawn into Group A with the Dominican Republic and New Zealand.

If Serbia finishes as one of the top two teams in its group, they will advance to the final round of the Belgrade Tournament and will play against one of the top two finishers of Group B, which is composed of Puerto Rico, Italy, and Senegal.

On 26 February 2021, Basketball New Zealand announced that they will pull out of the tournament. On the same day, FIBA announced that they will be replaced by the Philippines as the next best team from the Asia-Oceania region in FIBA World Rankings. On 28 June, Senegal canceled their participation in the tournament due to COVID-19 outbreak in their roster so they will be fortified 0–20 in both scheduled games of Group B.

The winning team of this tournament will qualify for the 2020 Summer Olympics in Tokyo, Japan.

Preliminary round

All times are local UTC+2.

Dominican Republic 
The game was originally scheduled for 23 June 2020, and rescheduled due to the COVID-19 pandemic.

The Serbia roster finished strong at the opener, beating the Dominican Republic 94–76. While the Serbians had a bit of a point cushion at the end, it wasn't an easy win at all.

Serbia entered the game in a dunk mode, with six of the first ten points coming by throw-downs from Boban Marjanović, Ognjen Dobrić, and Nemanja Bjelica for an early 10–2 lead. But the Dominicans answered back. Led by Víctor Liz and Gelvis Solano, they came back and then took the first lead of the game two minutes before the halftime, 46–45, before it was all tied up 47–47 after a very intense first half. With the third quarter coming to a close, the Serbians raised their game up a notch as they carried this momentum into the fourth where they found their best defense, energy, and offensive rhythm. The turning point was a zone defensive scheme by Serbia's head coach Igor Kokoškov at the start of the final quarter helped his team buckle down for a 9–0 run. From then on, Serbia took an advantage they would only increase until the final buzzer. Outscoring the Dominican Republic 27–10 over the final ten minutes of the game gives them some level of confidence going forward in the tournament. Center Marjanović finished with a double-double, recording 18 points and 10 rebounds for a total efficiency plus-minus score of 27. He was 7-of-12 in the paint and 4-of-4 from the line. Center Filip Petrušev added 17 points of the bench, and guard Vasilije Micić recorded 16 points and five assists. As expected, Serbia dominated the points from the paint 58–24 but didn't take advantage in rebounding as maybe was a plan (43–37). Fast break points also played a significant role, as the "Eagles" picked up 24 of them, mainly in the fourth quarter, compared to just nine from the Dominicans.

Philippines 
The game was originally scheduled for 24 June 2020, and rescheduled due to the COVID-19 pandemic. This will be the second competitive game between Serbia and the Philippines. Previously, Serbia had a 126–67 won over the Philippines at the 2019 FIBA Basketball World Cup in China on 2 September 2019.

Serbia grabbed a vital 83–76 win over the Philippines. Serbia needed a thrilling finish to withstand the "Gilas" but the victory nonetheless sees the reigning Olympic silver medalists into the Belgrade Olympic Qualifying Tournament as the first-place team from Group A to advance to the Semi-Finals.

The Serbia side was in front from the tip-off till the R. J. Abarrientos lay-up at 3:50 to go in the fourth quarter, but on the wings of Boban Marjanović's dominance in the paint, his team finds a way out. Serbia head coach Igor Kokoškov decided to rest three players from starting a previous line-up due to minor injuries (Nemanja Bjelica, Nikola Kalinić, and Vasilije Micić). But, a massive problem for the home team occurred in the middle of the fourth quarter, when Stefan Jović helped to leave the floor. After leading the for 36 minutes, Serbia allowed the Gilas to take their first and only lead of the game, 74–73. But, in a similar fashion to Serbia's tournament opening game the previous night, they found a way to win it by closing with a 10–2 run. After a fantastic season in his club Crvena zvezda mts, Ognjen Dobrić continued his growth in a national team jersey, putting up 16 points while going 4-from-7 from the three point line. Center Marjanović also showed off his double-double stats mode with 25 points and 11 rebounds. Center Angelo Kouame shined in the Philippines team with 17 points and 7 rebounds. After a poor three-point shooting night against the Dominican Republic in the tournament opener, the "Eagles" found some rhythm out of the line, scoring 9 from 26 shots. Also, Serbians have a massive advantage over rivals in the points from the paint, 46–28.

Final round 

Serbia finished as the group winner in its preliminary group and advanced to the semi-finals of the 2020 FIBA Men's Olympic Qualifying Tournament in Belgrade and played against the runner-up of Group B, which will be Puerto Rico, on 3 July.

All times are local UTC+2.

Semi-final: Win over Puerto Rico 
Serbia and Puerto Rico previously met on multiple occasions. Serbia won over Puerto Rico at the 2016 Olympic Qualifying Tournament Final in Belgrade, as well at the 2019 World Cup in China. Most recent, Serbia had an 80–68 win over Puerto Rico at the Acropolis Tournament on 18 June.

After two lukewarm games to start the tournament, Serbia found a way to turn up the heat in an intensely contested game against Puerto Rico to win, 102–84. It's a win-and-you're-in game with a place in the Olympic 12-team tournament on the line. Nemanja Bjelica's three-pointer to beat the first-quarter buzzer saw Serbia take a 28–26 lead, one they would never relinquish, much to the delight of fans in Belgrade. Puerto Rico's side started the game with intensity and aggression that led to a pretty solid first quarter. Then came Bjelica' early dagger dime and the Serbians team took control thereafter, finding a strong offensive rhythm. The ball was moving well; the numbers of assisted points started to rise to the tune of 30 assists and 12 triples. Guard Vasilije Micić continued to play his MVP basketball after one game of rest. He scored 23 points and dished 8 assists. Forward Bjelica also stepped up, contributing with 18 points and 8 rebounds. Guard Miloš Teodosić led the team in assists with 10.

The victory puts the defending Olympic silver medalists into the Sunday Final where they will face Italy.

The Final: Lost to Italy

The Italian roster will play this summer at the Tokyo 2020 men's basketball Olympic tournament with their 102–95 victory over Serbia in the FIBA Olympic qualifying tournament final. Fueled by their fantastic three-point shooting display as the Italians earned their first Olympics appearance since the 2004 Athens Games, where they won the silver medal. Italian made it rain from beyond the arc seemingly all night in Belgrade as they made 14 three-pointers. Many of their attempts fell at the very crucial moments of the game, an instrumental reason why the Italians will be making their country's 13th Olympics appearance in history.

The Italians relied on two of them, actually. The first was at the start of the game where they were able to stretch Serbia's defense, which paid off as the Italian's triple-point shots were falling. It was crowned with 25–9 to finish the first half after trailing by four (36–32 to 45–57). The second came with another precise shooting run in the second half that stopped Serbia from mounting an early comeback. The boys in blue played outstanding team basketball in the Final. The "Azzurri" also benefited from a career game from Achille Polonara. His two-way, double-double performance of 22 points and 12 rebounds earned him a total efficiency score of 32. Polonara was justly awarded the MVP Award following his team receiving their cardboard cutout ticket to Tokyo. Romeo Sacchetti's squad outrebounded the home team by small (39–36), but took 12 of them in the offensive end. And while most of the statistics were on Serbia's side in the end, the key was the fantastic shooting performance by the "Azzuri" team: 48 percent for 2 points, 41 percent for 3 point.

Statistics

Player statistics

See also 
 2016 Serbia OQT basketball team
 2020 Italy men's OQT basketball team

Notes

References

External links

Serbia men's OQT basketball team profile on FIBA

Basketball at the 2020 Summer Olympics – Men's qualification
2020
2020–21 in Serbian basketball